"Bottom of Your Soul" is a song by the American pop/rock band Toto. There were two pressings of the single: one with two renditions of the title track while the other was a 4-track summer 2006 edition. It failed to make the charts in either the USA or UK. The chorus of the song features Joseph Williams, who was then in the middle of his long hiatus from the group.

The music to the song was written collaboratively by nearly all the members of Toto, while the lyrics were written solely by David Paich.

Track list
 "Bottom Of Your Soul" (radio edit)  – (4.00)
 "Bottom Of Your Soul" (album version)  – (6.59)

Summer edition
 "Bottom Of Your Soul" (radio edit)  – (3.58)
 "Gypsy Train" (live)  – (7.12)
 "Africa / Rosanna / Bottom Of Your Soul" (TV mix medley - live)  – (4.50)
 "Bottom Of Your Soul" (album version)  – (6.57)

Personnel

Toto
David Paich – synthesizer, backing vocal
Steve Lukather – lead vocal (verse), guitars
Simon Phillips – drums
Bobby Kimball – backing vocal
Mike Porcaro – bass
Greg Phillinganes – piano, backing vocal

Guests
Joseph Williams – lead vocal (chorus)
Jason Scheff – backing vocal
 Shenkar – backing vocal
Lenny Castro – percussion

References

External links
Toto Official Website News Archives

Toto (band) songs
2006 singles
Songs written by David Paich
2006 songs
Songs written by Steve Lukather